Ketaki Narayan is an Indian actress and model. She appears in Malayalam , Marathi Cinema, Telugu and Hindi Cinema. She debuted with the Marathi film Youth. She has appeared in several short films and musical albums.

Early life
Ketaki Narayan hails from Akola, Maharashtra. She studied in Bharat Vidyalay, Akola. She completed her graduation in Computers from MIT, Pune. Ketaki worked as a Software Engineer in Cognizant before becoming full time model and actress, She won the Radio Mirchi Queen Bee Miss Talent - 2014. Ketaki appeared on the cover of various magazines including Femina, Vogue, FWD, Creme, Vanitha and New Woman.

Acting career

Ketaki started her career in acting with the Marathi film Youth.

Filmography

Feature films

Music videos

Short films

Web series

References

External links 
 
 
 
 

Indian film actresses
Actresses in Marathi cinema
Actresses in Malayalam cinema
Actresses in Telugu cinema
People from Akola
Living people
Actresses from Maharashtra
Year of birth missing (living people)